Randal E. Thomas is an American major general who was a member of the Army Special Forces in Vietnam from 1966 to 1969 and a member of the Illinois National Guard. Thomas graduated from Southern Illinois University Edwardsville in 1973 with a BS in English, and a MSed in 1980 in Instructional Technology. He also has a Master's of Strategic Studies from the U.S. Army War College. Thomas has been a member of the SIUE Hall of Fame since 2011.

Randal is from Glen Carbon, Illinois and he graduated from Collinsville High School. During his time serving in Vietnam, he was awarded a Purple Heart and a Bronze Star for valor in 1968–1969.

Thomas is also the Chairman of the Southern Illinois University Board of Trustees which governs the Carbondale campus, Edwardsville campus, School of Medicine in Springfield, and School of Dental Medicine in Alton. He was appointed to the board by Governor Pat Quinn.

See also 
 Illinois National Guard
 Adjutant general of Illinois

References

External links 

Living people
Illinois National Guard personnel
Southern Illinois University Edwardsville alumni
United States Army generals
National Guard (United States) generals
Year of birth missing (living people)